Vietnam participated at the 2018 Asian Para Games held in Jakarta, Indonesia from 6 to 13 October 2018.

The Vietnamese delegation was composed of 75 people, 52 of which were athletes and 11 were trainers and medical workers. Vietnam participated in 7 sports namely; athletics, swimming, powerlifting, chess, badminton, table tennis and judo. Vietnam Paralympic Association vice president and general secretary Vu The Phiet served as head of the delegation.

Medalists

Medals by sport

Medals by day

See also
 Vietnam at the 2018 Asian Games

References

2018
Asian Para Games
Nations at the 2018 Asian Para Games